Norrin, also known as Norrie disease protein or X-linked exudative vitreoretinopathy 2 protein (EVR2) is a protein that in humans is encoded by the NDP gene. Mutations in the NDP gene are associated with the Norrie disease.

Function 

Signaling induced by the protein Norrin regulates vascular development of vertebrate retina and controls important blood vessels in the ear. Norrin binds with high affinity to Frizzled 4, and Frizzled 4 knockout mice exhibit abnormal vascular development of the retina.

Clinical significance 

NDP is the genetic locus identified as harboring mutations that result in Norrie disease.  Norrie disease is a rare genetic disorder characterized by bilateral congenital blindness that is caused by a vascularized mass behind each lens due to a maldeveloped retina (pseudoglioma).

References

External links
  GeneReviews/NIH/NCBI/UW entry on NDP-Related Retinopathies

Further reading

Human proteins